Rut Castillo Galindo (born 16 September 1990) is a Mexican individual rhythmic gymnast. She represented Mexico at the 2020 Summer Olympics and became the first Mexican, and LGBTQ+ rhythmic gymnast to compete at an Olympic Games. She is the 2021 Pan American all-around champion. At the 2007 Pan American Games, she won the silver medal in hoop and the bronze medals in the all-around and clubs. She is an eight-time Central American and Caribbean Games champion. She has also competed at nine World Championships (2007, 2009, 2010, 2011, 2013, 2014, 2015, 2018, and 2019).

Early life 
Castillo was born on 16 September 1990 in Guadalajara. She began rhythmic gymnastics when she was six years old. Her brother, Job Castillo, plays badminton internationally for Mexico, and her sister, Sara Castillo, is a badminton coach.

Career
At the 2005 Pan American Championships, Castillo won the bronze medal in the team event. Then at the 2006 Central American and Caribbean Games, she won the gold medal in the team event. Individually, she won the silver medals in the all-around and the ball, both behind Cynthia Valdez, and the bronze medal in the rope. Then at the 2007 Pan American Games, she won the bronze medal in the all-around behind Lisa Wang and Valdez. In the event finals, she won the silver medal in the hoop behind Alexandra Orlando, and she won the bronze medal in clubs behind Orlando and Wang. She competed at her first World Championships in 2007, finished sixtieth in the all-around during the qualification round. At her second World Championships in 2009, she placed sixty-third in the all-around and helped the Mexican team in twenty-eighth.

Castillo won the all-around gold medal at the 2010 Central American and Caribbean Games. She also won the gold medal in the ribbon, and she won the silver medals in the ball, hoop, and rope. Then at the 2010 World Championships, she finished thirty-eighth in the all-around, and Mexico finished eighteenth in the team competition. In December 2010, she won three medals at the 2010 Pan American Championships, team gold, hoop gold, and rope silver. However, she tested positive for sibutramine, and in March 2011, she received a six-month suspension and was stripped of her medals.

Castillo returned to competition at the 2011 World Championships where she finished seventy-first in the all-around and seventeenth with the Mexican team. Then at the 2013 World Championships, she finished forty-fourth in the all-around. She began the 2014 season at the Pan American Championships where she won the team bronze medal. Then at the 2014 World Championships, she finished fiftieth in the all-around and seventeenth in the team competition. At the 2014 Central American and Caribbean Games, she won gold medals in the ball and hoop and the silver medals in the all-around and hoop, both behind Cynthia Valdez.

Castillo was selected to represent Mexico at the 2015 Pan American Games where she finished seventh in the all-around and qualified for all four event finals. She finished fifth in the ball final, fourth in the clubs final, and sixth in the hoop final and the ribbon final. Then at the 2015 World Championships, she finished fifty-seventh in the individual all-around and nineteenth with the Mexican team. This result was not high enough for Castillo to qualify a spot for the 2016 Olympic Games. She then represented Mexico at the 2017 Summer Universiade and finished ninth in the all-around final. She also qualified for the hoop and the clubs finals where she finished sixth and seventh, respectively.

Castillo began the 2018 season at Central American and Caribbean Games where she won her second all-around title. She also won the gold medal in the clubs and ribbon, and she won the silver medal in the hoop behind teammate Marina Malpica. The gold medal that she won in the clubs final was Mexico's one-hundredth gold medal at the Central American and Caribbean Games. She then competed at the 2018 World Championships where she finished thirty-first in the all-around and eighteenth with the Mexican team. Then at the 2018 Pan American Championships in Lima, she helped the Mexican team win the silver medal behind the United States, and she won the bronze medal in the ball behind Americans Laura Zeng and Nastasya Generalova. She represented Mexico at the 2019 Pan American Games, finishing tenth in the all-around and seventh in the ribbon final. She then competed at the 2019 World Championships in Baku and finished fiftieth in the all-around and twenty-fifth with the Mexican team.

At the 2021 Pan American Championships in Rio de Janeiro, Castillo helped the Mexican team win the silver medal behind Brazil. She then won the gold medal in the all-around ahead of Bárbara Domingos and Natália Gaudio and qualified for the 2020 Olympic Games. She became the first Mexican rhythmic gymnast to qualify for an Olympic Games. At the 2020 Olympic Games, Castillo finished twenty-second in the qualification round for the individual all-around.

Personal life 
Castillo is openly lesbian. She was one of two openly LGBTQ+ athletes representing Mexico at the 2020 Summer Olympics, and she was the only openly LGBTQ+ rhythmic gymnast at the 2020 Olympics.

References

External links
 
 
 https://living.alot.com/entertainment/meet-the-lgbtq-athletes-competing-at-the-olympics--19225 

1990 births
Living people
Mexican rhythmic gymnasts
Doping cases in gymnastics
Central American and Caribbean Games gold medalists for Mexico
Central American and Caribbean Games medalists in gymnastics
Central American and Caribbean Games silver medalists for Mexico
Competitors at the 2006 Central American and Caribbean Games
Competitors at the 2010 Central American and Caribbean Games
Competitors at the 2014 Central American and Caribbean Games
Competitors at the 2018 Central American and Caribbean Games
Gymnasts at the 2007 Pan American Games
Gymnasts at the 2015 Pan American Games
Gymnasts at the 2020 Summer Olympics
Lesbian sportswomen
LGBT gymnasts
Mexican LGBT sportspeople
Medalists at the 2007 Pan American Games
Pan American Games bronze medalists for Mexico
Pan American Games medalists in gymnastics
Pan American Games silver medalists for Mexico
Olympic gymnasts of Mexico
21st-century Mexican women